This is a tree of the monarchs of the traditional Kingdom of Dagbon, the kingdom of the Dagomba people, located in northern Ghana.

The term Yaa-Naa means "king of strength" in the Dagbani language. It was adopted by king (Naa) Shitobu, and has since been the term for the king of Dagbon.

See also
Ghana
Gold Coast
Lists of office-holders

References 

Rulers
Lists of African rulers